Law and Justice Division is a Bangladesh government division under the Ministry of Law, Justice and Parliamentary Affairs responsible for managing the judicial apparatus of Bangladesh. Md. Golam Sarwar is the secretary in charge of the Law and Justice Division.

History
In December 2009, the Government of Bangladesh, led by Prime Minister Sheikh Hasina, divided the Ministry of Law, Justice and Parliamentary Affairs into the Legislative and Parliamentary Affairs Division and Law and Justice Division.

On 29 July 2018, Law and Justice Division launched the Justice Audit Bangladesh in partnership with Deutsche Gesellschaft für Internationale Zusammenarbeit at the Bangabandhu International Conference Center. The purpose of the audit is to examine the judicial services of Bangladesh. The government of Bangladesh allocated 17.4 billion taka for the Law and Justice Division for the 2020-2021 budget session. 

On 6 March 2020, Bangladesh High Court asked the Secretary of the law and justice division to explain why Md Abdul Mannan, Sessions Judge of Pirojpur, was removed from his position. The court observed that the Judge was removed few hours after sentencing former Government Minister and Member of Parliament, A. K. M. A. Awal Saydur Rahman, and his wife in a corruption case. The judge also questioned if the transfer was an infringement of the judicial independence and why it should not be declared illegal.

Units
Solicitor Wing
Bangladesh Supreme Court
Bangladesh Law Commission
Bangladesh Judicial Service Commission
National Legal Aid Services Organization
Directorate of Registration
Judicial Administration Training Institute
International Crimes Tribunal

References

2009 establishments in Bangladesh
Organisations based in Dhaka
Government departments of Bangladesh